This was the first edition of the tournament.

Lidziya Marozava and Andreea Mitu won the title, defeating Marina Melnikova and Conny Perrin in the final, 3–6, 6–4, [10–3].

Seeds

Draw

Draw

References
Main Draw

Oeiras Ladies Open - Doubles
Tennis tournaments in Portugal